Grand Ayatollah Hajj Sheikh Abdolkarim Haeri Yazdi (1859 – 30 January 1937) was a Twelver Shia Muslim scholar and marja. He was the founder of an important Islamic seminary (hawza) in Qom, Iran. Among his students was Ruhollah Khomeini.

Early life 

Haeri was born in the city of Meybod in Mehrjard village in southeastern Iran. He studied at Yazd, then at Samarra under Grand Ayatollah Mirza Hassan Shirazi, and completed his training at Najaf with Mohammad-Kazem Khorasani and Muhammad Kazim Yazdi. In 1906, he reportedly became disenchanted with the politicization from the Iranian Constitutional Revolution and moved back to Najaf, Iraq. When Najaf became political, he moved to Karbala until political excitement cooled in 1913 when he moved back to Arak in Iran. By 1921, he was a "well-known and respected teacher" and "good administrator" and he accepted an invitation of Mullahs in Qom "to act as doyen" to the circles of learning in that Shrine town.

Under Haeri, Qom moved from a respectable provincial Madrasah to a major center of learning close to the level of Najaf. Although "some of his contemporaries outshone" him as jurisconsults, Haeri became the marja for "many religious Iranians."

Haeri's quietism was reflected in his willingness to meet cordially with both Shah Ahmad Shah Qajar and Prime Minister Reza Khan.

Qom Seminary

Students
 Ayatollah Borqei
 Ruhollah Khomeini
 Abolhasan Rafii Qazvini 
 Mohammad-Reza Golpaygani
 Mohammad Ali Araki
 Sayeed Shahabuddin Marashi Najafi
 Jafar Eshraghi
 Sayeed Ahmad Zanjan
 Ayatollah Haj Mirza Khalil Kamareyi
 Mohammad Mohaghegh Damad
 Shamseddin Mataji Kojouri
 Mirza Hashem Amoli

See also

Ruhollah Khomeini
List of Islamic studies scholars
List of Maraji
List of Ayatollahs

References

Sources
 

1859 births
1937 deaths
Iranian grand ayatollahs
People from Yazd
Pupils of Muhammad Kadhim Khorasani
Burials at Fatima Masumeh Shrine
People of Qajar Iran